The Festa Literária Internacional de Paraty (International Literary Festival of Paraty- FLIP) is a literary festival held yearly since 2003 in the Brazilian city of Paraty, in the state of Rio de Janeiro. The festival usually happens in early July; in World Cup years, FLIP happens in August.

Funding is provided by a graduated system of sponsors and is driven by the nonprofit Associação Casa Azul. In addition to lectures, discussions, literary workshops and events for children (Flipinha) and young people (Flipzona) are also held. The worldwide success since its founding year is mainly due to the involvement of internationally recognized authors from several countries.

The festival was devised by English publisher Liz Calder, co-founder of Bloomsbury Publishing, who lived in Brazil and was the literary agent for several Brazilian authors, using as a model the Hay Festival in the United Kingdom. FLIP is associated with other similar events, such as the International Festival of Authors in Toronto, Canada, and Festivaletteratura in Mantua, Italy, to show intercultural literature.

FLIP originated a pocket edition in the United Kingdom, named Flipside, held at Snape Maltings.

Authors honored at FLIP
Each year the festival celebrates an individual writer.

2003 - Vinicius de Moraes
2004 - Guimarães Rosa
2005 - Clarice Lispector
2006 - Jorge Amado
2007 - Nelson Rodrigues
2008 - Machado de Assis
2009 - Manuel Bandeira
2010 - Gilberto Freyre
2011 - Oswald de Andrade
2012 - Carlos Drummond de Andrade
2013 - Graciliano Ramos
2014 - Millôr Fernandes
2015 - Mário de Andrade 
2016 - Ana Cristina Cesar 
2017 - Lima Barreto
2018 - Hilda Hilst
2019 - Euclides da Cunha

References

External links
 Official page (in Portuguese and English)
Flipside Festival

Literary festivals in Brazil
2003 establishments in Brazil
Rio de Janeiro (state)
Brazilian literature